Kumataro Honda (1874-1948) was a Japanese diplomat. He served as the Japanese ambassador to Germany, with inaugural date of February 6, 1924. He later replaced Nobuyuki Abe, serving as the Japanese ambassador in Nanjing from 1940 to 1941 for the Wang Jingwei regime within the Republic of China. He resigned in December 1941 because of health issues and was succeeded by Mamoru Shigemitsu.

References

1874 births
1948 deaths
Ambassadors of Japan to Germany
Ambassadors of Japan to China
Wang Jingwei regime